David Byerman formerly served as director of the Kentucky Legislative Research Commission from 2015-2018.  In this capacity he managed all nonpartisan legislative staff in Kentucky, overseeing an agency with approximately 400 employees and a $70.4 million annual budget. Byerman was announced as the unanimous choice of legislative leadership on September 10, 2015 and was formally appointed by the 16-member Legislative Research Commission on September 23, 2015.  In a surprise move, it was announced in August 2018 that his contract would not be renewed for a fourth year.

Biography
Byerman is a graduate of McQueen High School in Reno, Nevada.  He received his Bachelor of Arts degree, magna cum laude, from the University of Redlands, with a double major in history and political science, serving as President of the student body.  Byerman earned a Master of Governmental Administration degree from the Fels Institute of Government at the University of Pennsylvania.

He is married to Caroline Byerman.  They have two children, Amanda and Will.

Early career
Byerman began his career as executive director of Greater Philadelphia Clean Cities, Inc., a public-private partnership that promotes alternative fuel vehicles.  Under Byerman's leadership, Greater Philadelphia Clean Cities developed from a start-up non profit to the become the winner of the "Governor's Award for Environmental Excellence," an honor awarded by Governor Tom Ridge in 1998.

Byerman moved back to his home state of Nevada in 1998 and served on the senior staff of Governor Bob Miller.  There, Byerman served as executive assistant to the governor, a policy position in which Byerman managed transportation, environmental, and information technology issues as a member of the governor's senior staff.  From the governor's staff, Byerman went on to lead intergovernmental relations for the Nevada Department of Transportation.

As a volunteer in his community, David has served as president of the Sparks Chamber of Commerce, chairman of the State of Nevada's Advisory Committee on Participatory Democracy, and chairman of the board of the Nevada Association of Nonprofit Organizations.

Census 2000 and Census 2010
Byerman served as chief government liaison for Nevada for the U.S. Census Bureau during both the 2000 and 2010 Census campaigns.  In this role, Byerman served as the lead strategist and media spokesman for both campaigns.  Nevada's 2000 Census Campaign produced the biggest turnaround of any state in the nation; while 2.3% of Nevadans were missed in 1990, the undercount was cut to only 1.6% in 2000.  The improved Census count was calculated to have produced $16 million for Nevada annually in additional federal allocations from 2000 to 2010.  Both campaigns were highly successful, and Byerman was widely credited with having played a major role as both an advocate and an organizer.

Secretary of the Senate
David Byerman was the 40th secretary of the Senate for the Nevada Senate.  He was appointed by then-Senate Majority Leader Steven Horsford on August 18, 2010 and was then unanimously elected by the full Nevada Senate on February 7, 2011 and on February 4, 2013.

David Byerman was the first Southern Nevada resident ever appointed to serve as Secretary of the Senate.  The position is full-time and non-partisan.  As Secretary of the Senate, Byerman served as the Chief Executive Officer and Parliamentarian for the Nevada State Senate.  The Secretary of the Senate oversees a session staff that grows to over 100 during legislative sessions, and includes legislative staff, floor staff, sergeants at arms, research assistants, and others.

Secretary Byerman implemented a wide variety of initiatives to increase accessibility and transparency in government during his terms of office.  Channel 21 serves as a communications channel for the Senate and includes Senate news and information, explanations about jargon and legislative terminology, live video of Senate committee and floor sessions, national and local news, and meeting information.  SENarts was a partnership among the Nevada Senate, Nevada Division of Museums and Nevada Arts Council that included arts competitions, programs, and a campaign to build the Senate’s permanent art collection.  uLegislate was a simulation in the Senate Chambers that offered visitors the chance to play the roles of Senators and Senate officers on the floor of the Senate.

After a change in party control in the Senate for the 2015 Legislative Session, the new Republican leadership announced that former secretary Claire J. Clift would be re-appointed to the job.

Director of the Legislative Research Commission
Byerman assumed office on October 1, 2015, taking the helm of an agency that had been racked by a sexual harassment scandal and poor management practices.  Citing a highly professional workforce, Byerman expressed early optimism in a full recovery for the agency. He wrote an op-ed less than a week into his tenure, which was widely run in every major newspaper in the state, in which he was widely quoted saying that LRC needed to "get its swagger back."  Byerman assumed office on October 1, 2015 and currently makes $141,750 a year under a contract extension announced in September 2017.

After over a year in office, Byerman was credited by Senate President Robert Stivers with making progress in addressing policy issues at LRC.  In his first two months with the agency, over 125 employees scheduled one-on-one meetings with the director.  He has moved to shore up internal LRC communications, establishing a daily internal news bulletin, launching a bimonthly newsletter, and establishing a social media presence under the handle @DirectorLRC.  He also changed a longtime policy where employees were awarded a set number of comp time hours at the sole discretion of the Director, opting instead to adopt a "one for one" comp time approach.

In August 2016, Byerman presented, and the Legislative Research Commission approved, an employee classification plan.  This established—for the first time in the agency's history—formal job descriptions for all positions and a formal organizational structure. For years, LRC employees operated without clearly explained procedures for advancement or pay increases, with the staff feeling that many decisions were being made arbitrarily by previous directors. Then House Speaker Greg Stumbo gave Byerman's plan high marks, saying it was a good plan that addressed longstanding issues documented by the National Conference of State Legislatures.  Byerman plans to implement performance evaluations based on the classification plan.

In 2017, the LRC announced that it had updated its measurement of employee satisfaction, using an identical survey to one used to diagnose widespread employee dissatisfaction previously.  The updated survey dramatic improvement for the agency under Byerman's leadership, with LRC showing improvements in 49 of the 54 areas in which employee satisfaction was measured.  The area that showed the biggest change between 2014 and 2017 reflected increased confidence that LRC’s hiring practices are consistent for all job openings. On a four-point scale, employee responses on that topic were almost nine-tenths of a point higher in this year’s survey.  Overall, employee satisfaction with Byerman's performance as Director was measured at 73%.  Shortly after the survey results were released, Byerman received a contract extension from the Legislative Research Commission.

In August, 2018, legislative leadership informed Director Byerman that his contract would not be renewed for a fourth year.  The move was widely believed to have been made for political reasons, causing an outcry from editorial pages and constituent groups.  Upon news breaking of his pending departure, Byerman was hailed by constituents and some legislative leaders for his efforts at transparency, citizen engagement, and youth empowerment. In a statement, House Minority Leader Rocky Adkins hailed Byerman for bringing “a deep level of experience and expertise. Legislators and legislative staff alike owe him a great deal for his many contributions.” The role of LRC Director is being handled on an acting basis by partisan staff at the current time, for the first time in the history of the agency.

Awards and recognition

In May 2013, Secretary Byerman was honored with the Jean Ford Democracy Award by Secretary of State Ross Miller in recognition of his dedication to engaging the public in the democratic process.

In April 2014 Secretary Byerman was announced by the Clark County Law Foundation as a winner of the Liberty Bell Award.  According to the citation, the Liberty Bell Award, "recognizes individuals in the community who uphold the rule of law, contribute to good 
government within the community, stimulate a sense of civic responsibility, and encourage respect for the law 
in the courts."

At its Legislative Summit, the National Conference of State Legislatures announced in August 2014 that Secretary Byerman was the recipient of the Kevin B. Harrington Award.  The award, named for Senator Kevin B. Harrington, "recognizes an individual or organization for advancing public understanding of state and local representative democracy."

References

External links 
 Interview with KPVM Television, Pahrump
 Press Conference with Congresswoman Dina Titus, Excerpt
 NCSL Presentation of Kevin B. Harrington Award to Secretary Byerman
 CN|2 Interview with David A. Byerman, Recorded 10/6/15

1971 births
University of Redlands alumni
Living people
Fels Institute of Government alumni
Mensans